is jidaigeki novel written by Tōkō Kon and published in 1956. Kon won the Naoki Prize for the novel.

The novel deals with Sen no Rikyū's daughter Ogin and Takayama Ukon. The novel was adapted into film twice.

Adaptation
 Love Under the Crucifix (1962), a Bungei pro production, directed by Kinuyo Tanaka. It stars Ineko Arima.
 Ogin-sama aka Love and Faith (1978), a Takarazuka Eiga production, directed by Kei Kumai and screnplay by Yoshikata Yoda. It stars Takashi Shimura.

References

Fictional samurai
Japanese novels
Japanese historical novels
1962 films
1978 films